Ryston is a small village and civil parish in the English county of Norfolk. It once had its own railway station.

The villages name means 'Brushwood farm/settlement'.

For the purposes of local government, it falls within the district of King's Lynn and West Norfolk.

St Michael's parish church dates from the 12th century and was restored in 1901. It is a Grade II* listed building.
 
Ryston Hall is a Grade II* listed country house, built 1669-72 by the architect Sir Roger Pratt as his own home in 1669. It was later remodelled c.1780 by Sir John Soane and again by Anthony Salvin in 1867.  The formal gardens and woodland walks are open to the public several times a year.

Ryston railway station opened in 1882; it was closed to passengers in 1930.

Notes 

http://kepn.nottingham.ac.uk/map/place/Norfolk/Ryston

External links

Villages in Norfolk
Civil parishes in Norfolk
King's Lynn and West Norfolk